Morocco made its Paralympic Games début at the 1988 Summer Paralympics in Seoul. It was represented by an all-male team, with five competitors in athletics, three in swimming, and a wheelchair basketball team. Abdeljalal Biare won a bronze medal in the 400m freestyle (category 4) in swimming - Morocco's sole medal of the 1988 Games.

Morocco has participated in every edition of the Summer Paralympics since then, albeit never in the Winter Paralympics. Moroccans have won a total of eleven gold medals (all since 2004), seven silver and eight bronze. Mustapha El Aouzari won gold in the men's 1,500m in athletics in 2004, in the T11 category for totally blind runners. The same year, Abdellah Ez Zine won gold in the men's 800m (T52 category). In 2008, Sanaa Benhama was Morocco's first female Paralympic champion, and the country's most successful Paralympian to date, when she won three gold medals in the 100m, 200m and 400m sprints, in the T13 category for partially sighted athletes. Abdelillah Mame won the country's other gold medal of the Games, in the men's 800m (T13).

Morocco took part in the 2012 Summer Paralympics, with the Royal Moroccan Federation of Sports for Disabled using Bedford as the UK base for its Paralympians.

Medals

Medals by Summer Games

Medals by Summer sport

List of medalists

Athletes with most medals 
The Moroccan athlete who won the most medals in the history of the Paralympic Games, is the Paralympian athlete Sanaa Benhama.

See also
 Morocco at the Olympics

References